Paul Rodriguez may refer to:

 Paul Rodriguez (actor) (born 1955), Mexican-American stand-up comedian and actor
 Paul Rodríguez, financial advisor and candidate in the 2022 New York State Comptroller election
 Paul Rodriguez (skateboarder) (born 1984), American professional street skateboarder and actor, son of Paul Rodriguez (actor)
 Brian Rodríguez (Paul Brian Rodríguez Bravo, born 2000), Uruguayan footballer

See also
Paulo Rodrigues (disambiguation)
Paulo Rodriguez (disambiguation)